Pentyukhov is a rural locality (a khutor) in Dukmasovskoye Rural Settlement of Shovgenovsky District, the Republic of Adygea, Russia. The population was 111 as of 2018. There is 1 street.

Geography 
Pentyukhov is located 32 km southwest of Khakurinokhabl (the district's administrative centre) by road. Chikalov is the nearest rural locality.

References 

Rural localities in Shovgenovsky District